Craig Smart is an Australian journalist.

Career
Smart completed his Bachelor of Journalism at Murdoch University in 1998 and began his career as a journalist with West Australian Newspapers in Albany. He spent 10 years with the ABC as a reporter and radio news presenter from 2000 to 2010. He was the ABC's weekend television presenter from late 2005 to 2010.

In 2011, Smart joined Ten News Perth as a presenter alongside Narelda Jacobs.

In November 2012, Smart's contract with Network Ten was not renewed, with the bulletin returning to a single presenter format.

References 

Living people
Murdoch University alumni
Writers from Perth, Western Australia
Australian television journalists
ABC News (Australia) presenters
10 News First presenters
Year of birth missing (living people)